The 2019 LNFA season was the 25th season of American football in Spain. It began on 19 January 2019 and ended 25 May 2019 with the LNFA Bowl.

Badalona Dracs successfully defended their title from the previous season, defeating Las Rozas Black Demons in the LNFA Bowl.

Competition format
For the 2019 season, the league was reduced to twelve teams. Valencia Giants, Santurtzi Coyotes, L'Hospitalet Pioners and Alicante Sharks declined to continue at Serie A, while Fuengirola Potros and Zaragoza Hurricanes joined the league.

The teams were divided into three groups of four, according to geographical criteria. All teams play eight games during the regular season: two games (home and away) against each other team in their group, plus two inter-group games (against one team of each other group).

At the end of the regular season, the eight best teams in the aggregate table qualify for the playoffs. Final position in the aggregate table will determine seeding for the playoffs.

Tiebreakers
If two or more teams are tied at the end of the competition, the ranking of teams in each group is based on the following criteria:
 Highest percentage of wins in games between tied teams.
 Lowest percentage of points against in games between tied teams.
 Highest difference between points scored and points against in games between tied teams.
 Lowest percentage of points against in all the games.
 Highest difference between points scored and points against in all the games.
 Lowest percentage of sent off players in all the games.
 Drawing of lots.

Stadia and locations

Fifteen teams entered the LNFA Serie A, the top-tier level of American football in Spain, after the changes in the competition format.

Regular season

Northwest Group

Northeast Group

South Group

Aggregate table

Results

Playoffs

Copa de España
Prior to the season, the Copa de España was played between the five teams that registered in the competition.

Badalona Dracs retained the title and achieved their fourth trophy ever.

The final was played at Estadio Pedro Escartín in Guadalajara.

References

External links
Spanish American Football Federation
Fieldgoal.eu

Liga Nacional de Fútbol Americano
2019 in Spanish sport
2019 in American football